The foothill schiffornis (Schiffornis aenea) is a species of Neotropical bird.

Distribution and habitat
It is found central Ecuador and northern Peru.  Its natural habitats are subtropical or tropical moist lowland forests and subtropical or tropical moist montane forests.

Description
It is medium-sized, about 24 cm (9 in.) long.

Taxonomy
The foothill schiffornis has traditionally been placed in the manakin family, but evidence strongly suggest it is better placed in Tityridae, where it is now placed by the South American Classification Committee.

The species was split by the AOU in 2013 from the species complex thrush-like schiffornis.

References

foothill schiffornis
Birds of the Ecuadorian Andes
foothill schiffornis
foothill schiffornis